Di-Gata Defenders is an animated series created by Greg Collinson that was produced by LuxAnimation and Nelvana Entertainment. The series follows the travels and adventures of six teenagers, part of an organization called the Di-Gata Defenders. Their mission as heroes is to defend RaDos against evil factions. The series aired for two seasons.

Creation
In 2005, Nelvana Entertainment created a project called the Funpack. It was designed to allow creators to pitch and create 5 minute interstitials. At the time, Greg Collinson didn't plan on pitching anything for this project until a colleague of his discussed about it on a train ride. He spent two weeks creating the "bible" for his series idea, which was initially named Power Stone Warriors. In this bible, he planned out the prototype characters, factions, and the universe the series would take place in. He later meets with the executives at Nelvana and Greg pitches his bible to them. Pleased with the promise this series had, Greg Collinson was given the greenlight to produce this series with help from Ken Cuperus, a script writer. The series then launched September 16, 2006 under its new name - Di-Gata Defenders.

Broadcast
In the United States, the series aired on 4KidsTV.
In January 2018, Disney XD (Canada) began to broadcast reruns of the show but was taken off the schedule on September 1, 2018 but put back on the schedule on March 14, 2022. Prior to that, it had been available on Bell and Roger's KidSuite in 2016. As of June 2022, Teletoon currently airs reruns of the show.

History of RaDos
The humans, or RaDosians, of this world came from another planet. The planet's inhabitants were mostly dark-skinned, white haired individuals with glowing blue eyes. However, these people were struck with a life-destroying Toten'Ka virus, which had spread across their planet and killed millions. A small team of RaDos Primes (the name of these original aliens) escaped from their planet on a starship. These original humans eventually crash landed in RaDos. The sun and atmosphere of RaDos began to take effect on their physical forms, turning them into the people of the current timeline. But in doing so, they eventually exiled the original inhabitants, the Mortigarians, a race of amphibious snake-like humanoids to live under the sea. The people that live in RaDos as of the current timeline are the descendants of these first RaDosians.

Before the humans arrived in this world, mystical beings called the Primordials roamed the realm. Their bodies used mystical energies as their life force. As they died, their life force leeched into the rocks of Di-Gata Mountains. Humans soon crash landed on the planet, caused by a stowaway creature named the Wrath-norak and a virus from their dying planet. Under Rados' sun, man's skin colour soon changed. Man was then able to mine the enchanted rocks found in the mountains, but were only able to recover energy from eight of the eleven sigils. Many rocks were mined by man, then carved into dice-like Di-Gata stones, and these were then carved with the sigil their power contained. From this point onward, anyone who used these stones were called stone casters or stone-slingers. It was believed that the first people who used these stones of power were called the Chi'Brek Tribe. This tribe was also the first tribe to document the arrival of the human race onto the planet.

There are currently ten known power forms in RaDos called Sigils. These sigils take up energy forms inside of Di-Gata Stones. But because the power of one sigil isn't as strong as the other, multiple sigils must be used, creating Henges. This creates a far greater concentration of power. However, some sigils do not need to be formed into henges, due to the extreme power that is contained within them (Vitus and Nostrum Vitae). The thirteen Power Sigils are:

 Ogama - (Order - Extreme heat)
 Dako - (Chaos - Flood)
 Yin - (Youth - Volcanic eruption)
 Yan - (Wisdom - Water scarcity)
 Altas - (Balance - Hurricane)
 Nega - (Force - Wildfire)
 Sum - (Peace - Earthquake)
 Infinis - (Eternity - Tsunami)
 Vitus - (Renewal)
 Nostrum Vitae - (Life - Unconfirmed)
 Ethos - (Stagnation)
 Orn-Ra - (The First Sigil)
 Mal-Ra - (The Last Sigil)
"The beginning and the end, both portions of the whole, both parts of a cycle without end. See that they are the one and the same and achieve balance"

Casters choose how many Sigils to use and their combination. A single Sigil was not very powerful on its own, but combining multiple Sigils often led to unpredictable and uncontrollable powers. Most casters choose to specialize in only one or two sigils, to make sure they retain complete control of their power at all times. Otherwise, miscasting (where the forming of the Henge doesn't perform correctly) would become common and hazardous to both the caster or their allies.

In short, these stones contain great power. However, some were not using it for the purposes for good. The Wizards of Yan, a powerful order of RaDos' most powerful wizards and stone-casters formed a group, the Di-Gata Defenders. These Defenders were trained to use these stones to police the realm against those who would use such power for evil purposes.

But amongst their own ranks, a wizard named Nazmul wanted to keep all the power of the realm for himself. So he recruited powerful stone casters of his own and formed the Order of Infinis. Nazmul's goal was to achieve eternal life by any means necessary and establish his own rule in RaDos.

As the Order continued to flourish, Nazmul managed to find a way to re-create a guardian called the Megalith using a large portion of the Realm's energy. This beast had unparalleled power and virtually made Nazmul invincible. The creation of the Megalith forced the Di-Gata Defenders of the previous generation to engage it. The Wizards of Yan came up with a ritual, the Spell of Binding to counter this unbeatable foe. They hired Brim, a stone-carver to create the four Pure Stones, which were the casting mediums for this spell.

In the final battle, they used the Four Pure stones against the Megalith and sealed him within the Pure Stones using the Machine of Binding. However, the generation of Di-Gata Defenders made the ultimate sacrifice and also destroyed a portion of the land around the Machine. Nazmul's first body ends up being destroyed as well.

Four of the five children of the original Defenders were then taken to a secret Dojo (Adam was the fifth child but was taken by Brackus after his parents died as revealed in the episode, "The Adam and Eve of Destruction"), to go for training to prepare for the day when the Megalith should break free from his seal. After sensing the Megalith was about to come forth, they left their Dojo behind and ventured forth into the realm, to continue where their parents left behind - to seal the Megalith once more and stop anyone who dares to relive their horrifying incident.

However, they do succeed in stopping the Megalith, and crush the Order. Instead of sealing the Megalith as they first planned, they destroyed it with their combined efforts. For if they had proceeded with the seal, it would have brought forth the apocalypse of RaDos. The sealing was meant to be a cycle, to not only keep the Megalith imprisoned but also to keep the Di-Gata vampires known as the Ethos in check. The Ethos want one thing: to merge their world with RaDos, so they can have an unlimited supply of Di-gata energy, which when depleted, could very well bring the end of life to the entire realm. Now with the assistance of Rion, the six Defenders must now stop this ancient evil, as recompense for breaking the cycle and to save RaDos.

Eventually they discover a machine called the Celestial Abyss created by Filch to keep the Ethos out of Rados. They set out to find it only to discover that the wizards have scattered different pieces of it all over Rados. They find all of the pieces except for one, which is with Filch and Malco. Malco steals the rest of the pieces and Filch builds the machine. This unleashes the Ethos who reveal that Malco is possessed by one of them and they destroy him. The Defenders also receive a terrible blow as Rion gives in to his Ethonosian half. Adam turns him human just before the life force is sucked out of him and the others. Rion unleashes his anger and remorse by transforming the Celestial Abyss into his armour and defeating the Ethos after which Rados and her people go back to normal.

Provinces of Rados 
Ogama-Gor:
Constantly at war with the tribes of Dakor, Ogama-Gor is the most unified, organized and urbanized of all the eight provinces. Made up of dozens of feudal-style city states, Ogama-Gor is ruled by a confederacy called the Omegar. Heavily militarized and xenophobic, Ogamans are naturally distrustful of all the other Sigils and provinces except for Infinor, with whom they have a shaky alliance.

Ogaman military decisions are made on behalf of the civilian government by a council of generals called the Ogamarat. Even though the vast majority of the rank and file Ogaman military are levies and conscripts, the core of Ogaman military structure is the "Knights of Ogama-gor", a hereditary class of men and women who serve as a reservoir of military knowledge.

Dakor:
Mountainous and cold, Dakor is the home of the hearty Dakorian tribes. These tribes are in an almost constant state of war with each other and with their neighbours. Dakorians are very fraternal and bond together in closely knit familial tribes. Even within the tribe, conflict and challenge of authority is looked upon highly, and tribes form Di-Gorums to make decisions. Di-Gorums are essentially assemblies of a representative from each household getting together around an Obelisk and shouting at one another. As people agree with each other, they try to push one of their number to the top of the Obelisk while knocking opponents off. The first person to the top of the Obelisk makes the decision for the tribe.

Needless to say, Dakorian development is erratic and their forays into Ogaman territory to raid and pillage are constantly breaking down into petty squabbling and chaos.

Nega-La:
The least populated of the provinces, Nega-La is mainly arid desert and wetlands with the exception of the Binn Yati mountains. Communities in Nega-La are nomadic by nature, and many ply the trade routes that run to the oasis of Maudata in the south, trading in Dakorian Stone, Yantos mystical-technology, and Sumos wood. Actual urban centers are scarce, the largest being the trade capital of Maudata which surrounds the Oasis of NegLa. Maudatan stone carving is highly respected and sought after. Some of the most rare and legendary stones in Rados are carved in Maudata.

The Binn-Yati Mountains are unusual in that they house the Monks of NegLa, who legend says traveled from Maudata in the time before the Wizards and settled on Mount Yati to "watch over the Realm." Unlike the Gata-shin monks, the monks of Negla keep to themselves and do not tamper in the affairs of the world. Many pilgrims make the treacherous trek to the Monastery of Mount Yati to study with the Monks and learn the way of the sigils.

Yantos:
The most mystical of all the provinces, Yantos is the seat of the Gata-shin monks. Closely allied to the Wizards of Yan and the Di-Gata Defenders, the Gata-shin monks are all that remains of the structure of that old regime. Yantos is punctuated by towns built around various Monasteries who provide spiritual and physical protection. As a result, Yantos has become the reservoir of knowledge and wizard power in the Realm.

The North Veltlands are where the great herds of Yan-on graze, shepherded over by the Yantan herdsmen. Raids by Dakorian tribesmen are regular, but the natural barrier of Lake Di-Gata, Yi-maki and the Bridge of Yan prevent many of them from doing any lasting damage.

Sumos:
Sumos is a wild overgrown wilderness of ancient ruins and temples to long lost Sigils. Home to bandits and brigands, there are no known settlements in this area. This is exactly the reason that the monks decided to place the infant defenders in this province, hiding them away from prying eyes until they were ready to reshape the realm.

Of the many dangers that lurk in the woods of Sumos, the Rock Serpents are by far the most lethal. Very territorial, a rock serpent that feels threatened can level many Yantars of woods in an attempt to destroy its perceived challenger. The Serpents originate from the Ban-Gafi Rift and few travel near here.

Altamor:
Also known as the ghost province, Altamar used to be almost completely covered by the wizard city of Altamar. Completely destroyed by the Spell of Binding, all that remains of a once beautiful and mystical city is a series of blackened, burnt earth and smoking, charred craters. Some burnt ruins remain to testify to the grandeur and beauty of Altamar, but in essence all that remains is a wasteland. Only the truly desperate or insane spend any time in Altamor as it is widely seen as haunted.

When the Spell of Binding was cast, four great rifts in the earth spread out from the center of Altamor and now serve as great breaks that divide families and tribes.

Infinor:
Seat of the ancient Bakkorian kingdom, Infinor's geography is defined by the Rift of Yiman, which divides the province into Bakkor in the north and Nord-Binn in the south. Bakkor is the home of the dreaded thieves' guild, which controls much of the Black Vine forest and blighted swamp. In Northern Bakkor, many towns on the bay of Tantar thrive trading with Ogaman towns, despite the constant threat of large scale thieving and protection rackets.

Nord-Binn is mainly made up of farming and herding of the plentiful Yin-on, a close relative of the Yan-on. Direction and guidance is provided by the Elders of Arboth, a mining town in the Binn-ar woods that digs out the most precious and rare stone in the realm. It is said that the stone for the pure stones came directly from Arboth. Attack stones carved from Arbothian stone help defend the Binn-yama bridge from thief incursions.

Yin-tos:
Yin-Tos is a very militarized and technologically advanced state like Ogama-Gor, but it lacks the maturity and tradition that the Ogaman military states have. Yin-tos armies are led by a warlord (Brackus currently) who has absolute and dictatorial power. Yin-tos military structure is based on who is the most brutal, ambitious, and cut-throat person amongst them all. The geography of this province closely reflects the nature of its people, made up of mainly barren rock and rotten forests; the land is hard, unyielding and cruel. A large ridge called The Barrier defines the boundaries of Yin-tos; it is said that the ridge is the remains of a once palatial string of fortresses that Yin-tos used to dominate the Realm beyond.

Yintos is despised by the rest of the provinces because of its history of brutality and authoritarian use of power. Before the Wizards of Yan and the Di-Gata defenders reordered the Realm, Yintos held sway through draconian laws and brutal use of military power. When it was defeated by the defenders, Yintos went into a period of almost self-imposed exile from the Realm. When Nazmul betrayed the wizards, he found a very compliant conspirator in Yin-tos and their warlord Brackus. The armies of Yintos marched on Altamar and were all but destroyed in the conflagration of the Spell of Binding. Now rebuilt at great expense to the civilian population, the Yin-tos Armies and war machines are ready to once again claim their former glory. They were known to use carborad tanks.

Extending to the east of the province of Yin-Tos is a large expanse known as the 'Blasted Flats.' Essentially, it is a plain that seems to be made of glass and is uninhabitable. No one has ever traveled to the end of the Blasted Flats, but there is a legend that it was made by the ancient Bakkorians, presumably to keep something out of RaDos.

Episodes

Characters

Organizations 
Order of Infinis - The Order of Infinis was formed by a corrupt Wizard of Yan, Nazmul, who sought power and eternal life. They were the main antagonists of Season 1. In the end, Nazmul was sealed away (eventually killed), Brackus was banished to the Dark Realm for high treason, and the Yin-Tos army was destroyed in a civil war at the Spell Zone. Flinch was believed to be the only surviving member of the Order, until Brackus was found out to still be alive and Flinch somehow managed to find Malco again. The duo made an alliance with the Ethos to free Nazmul. The high members of the Order were once allies of the Defenders and helped to defeat the Ethos.

Ethos - Like the Order of Infinis, they are an organization with evil intentions. Long before the formation of the Order of Infinis, the Wizards of Yan imprisoned the Ethos in the Dark Realm, after the battle of Sum-Yan, using the Celestial Abyss. As part of their imprisonment, the Megalith was created as a result. When the Megalith was destroyed, it caused a force of energy powerful enough to release four Ethos back into Rados. Their plan is to merge both the Dark Realm and RaDos together, giving the Ethos what they desire: The Di-Gata energy they feed on, which will eliminate all life on the planet. They have made an alliance with the weakened Order of Infinis and have taken control over Malco.

Wizards of Yan - The most powerful beings of Rados who hold enormous power. The Wizards were responsible for the creation of the Di-Gata Defenders to protect the Realm from evil. They were responsible for building the Machine of Binding, and the Celestial Abyss, as well as sealing away the Ethos and Megalith. Nowadays, they no longer exist except for a select few. Nazmul, Professor Alnar and Melosa including her grandmother are the only known Wizards.

Rougon - The most hated hunters in all of the Realm. Rougon are human hunters and do anything for profit. Their base is located underwater, a perfect place for buying illegal items and other treasures. Their hideout was destroyed by the Defenders after the Yinicor was released from its prison.

Di-Gata Defenders - The protectors of Rados formed by the Wizards of Yan to protect the realm and its people from those who would use its sigil energy for evil. However, many Defenders over the years were killed in the line of duty and some defected over to the Order of Infinis. The current Defenders are Seth, Melosa, Erik, Rion, Adam and Kara and other notable Defenders were Rayald (killed by Malco), Formally Malco and the current Defenders' parents.

Yin-tos Army - They were once allies of to the Wizards of Yan against the Ethos in the Battle of Yan-Suma, then a subgroup of the Order of Infinis forces. These are mercenaries who are motivated by money and will go to any means to acquire it, but in the past were courageous warriors who fought to protect RaDos from evil. They swore allegiance to Brackus (both in the Wizard alliance and the Order of Infinis) and were under the sub-command of General Rube. After the collapse of the Order, some Yin-tos soldiers went to work for the Ethos.

Gatashin Monks - The group of monks who carried out quite a few tasks involving the Pure Stones. Four monks each carried a Pure Stone and hid it away, and some took the young Defenders to the Dojo, with the exception of Adam. The Key was hidden in the Amos-Yan Monastery, and guarded by the monks. A sub-sect of these monks also operate the Gatashin Prison, used to contain criminals that use RaDos' power for evil.

The Zad - A race of humanoid ant-eaters. They serve and carry out the will of Ethos. (See characters)

Yan-Nega class Wizards - They are wizards from the time of the Ethos. Kor Yin-an, a Yan-Nega class wizard who was with the Wizards at the Battle of Yan-Suma, wanted to betray them so he could plead for his life, but found himself locked up in a tomb for his betrayal.

Ogaman Federation - A group that Aaron the Hunter served with. They were formerly in possession of the Tome of Al-mortigar.

RaDos sorcery

Games 
There were four online games available for the show:
Di-Gata Sigil Shooter
DiGata Defenders: Invasion of Infinis
Power Stone Combat
Di-Gata Battle Training

The ATV and Battle games were also available on Teletoon.com while the show was airing.

In Di-Gata Online, they have four provinces unlocked, each containing a quest and re-playable mini-game after finishing the quest for that province. The battle arena is currently playable, but it has some bugs in it.

Di-Gata.com also released a battle training game based on the trading cards and stones game. It had four quests open and cost $15 CDN to get involved.

There was also a game produced for the Nintendo DS.

Stones 
Di-Gata Stones draw upon the mystic energy that simmers below the surface of the realm, and unleash it in the form of pure power. Each warrior has a different arsenal of Di-Gata stones. In battle, a warrior must choose how to use his stones to maximum effect, analyzing and opponent's strengths and weaknesses and deciding when to unleash their most powerful attacks.

There are nine types of stones, each having a different role of a Di-Gata battle.

 Shield Stones (Common) - These defensive stones are used to protect the caster from an opponents attack. The caster must choose wisely how many shield stones to use in a battle. The more shield energy used, the less powerful you will be in attack.
 Guardian Stones (Rare) - These stones are home to powerful creatures known as GUARDIANS. Each guardian has different attack and defensive powers. The Guardians vary in size and strength, but even the least powerful among them are a valuable asset to any duel.
 Warrior Stones (Rare) - A Warrior Stone exudes energy in many different forms, from an explosive fireball, to a high-voltage bolt of lightning. In battle, warrior stones are combined with booster stones for an additional burst of power.
 Booster Stones (Common) - These stones are used to enhance and strengthen the effect of the Warrior Stone. More booster stones added to a cast will result in more powerful attacks but will also increase the chance of a miscast. Only the most experienced casters tend to use more than one or two booster stones at a time.
 Champion (Henge) Stones (Ultra Rare) - These enormously powerful stones are extremely hard to come by, and with good reason. Because they already contain the combined Sigil known as a henge, they never fail when cast. The energy levels of the henge stones are also much greater than those of traditional power stones, making them a dangerous addition to any casters arsenal.
 Aqua Stones (Rare) - These stones are the only way a caster can cast spells out at sea or in large bodies of water. Since the above stones, except Guardians need physical land to draw on power to cast spells. These stones are made from enchanted rocks from a seabed and draw on trace amounts of power found in water to attack foes. Most spells involve using water manipulation, the manipulation of water. The Defenders and Brackus have some, but they only use them for 4 reasons:

 Overcomes one of their weaknesses, they can't swim.
 If they need to return to the surface with their sigil stormers.
 Survive underwater with no fear of water pressure and oxygen loss.
 Manipulate water to attack or imprison foes.

 Pure Stones (Only Four) - The four Di-Gata stones used to bind the Megalith. These stones are necessary to complete the Spell of Binding for entire cycles at time. However, due to some freak accident in not casting the Spell of Binding, the Pure Stones were destroyed, allowing the Megalith and Ethos to escape from their prisons. There are only four engraved with the sigils: Dako, Yan, Yin and Ogama.
 Nostrum Vitae Stone (Fabled) - First mentioned in "The Healer", Brackus uses the Sigil Stone called Nostrum Vitae to turn Abborantus into dust. He also uses its power to perform some of his healing miracles for the people or the Defenders. Nostrum Vitae is only used once when Brackus is a healer. Unless another defender uses it, Nostrum Vitae will not be used again.
 Wizard Stone (Only Five) - Carved by Mel's grandmother, these stones were created to lead the user to an Icon by giving the a vision of the location. Mel had the first vision, Seth the second, Erik the third, and Rion the fourth. The stones were not used for the fifth icon as Rion had a dream to where it was instead of using the stone.

Power Sigils 

There are currently ten known Power Sigils, each used to tap into a unique aspect of the realm's energy through dice-like Di-Gata Stones. Individually, each Sigil is capable of unleashing a burst of raw energy, but when used in combination with each other, the energy aspects blend together to form a Henge. Not only does this create a far greater concentration of power, it also allows access to other kinds of destructive or helpful powers. These sigils are also inscribed on various locations, objects, articles of clothing and sometimes as birthmarks or tattoos on the people's faces (like Brackus' Infinis tattoo on his forehead).To study the Sigils one must first realize that no sigil is evil and no sigil is good. The sigils transcend these moralistic notions, they represent parts of the whole and could never exist without their opposites. It is through the combination of Sigils that one creates true power, this is why pupils focus their study on two sigils, a single sigil is of limited value and power on its own.

Ogama, the sigil of Order. To study Ogama is to seek control and order in all things, even in chaos.
The Architect of creation, born out of chaos, Ogama's sphere of influence covers meanings from authoritarian to tranquil control. Studying Ogama allows the person to see that even in times of chaos and turmoil, there is still some hope to see order or control.

The Sigil: Ogama consists of an arch with two small bars and a bar struck through at the top. The arch represents the containment of something and the two small bars jutting out from the arch to give it a firm footing. The bar at the apex of the arch signifies the single power controlling all that is encompassed by the arch.

As a warrior sigil, Ogama's side points and the one atop its arc are used (Erik's Singeing Spar). As a booster, Ogama is either connected to the base sigil using the top bar on the arc (The Yan-Ogama henge on Si'i's stomach), or used as a separate sigil (Erik's Generator and Constructor).

Used by: Erik (Ogama and Infinis), Doku, and Bo (inexperienced) (Dako and Ogama).
Guardians: Robutus (Ogama), Lockdown (Ogama-Infinis), Voltantis (Ogama-Yin), and Si'i (Ogama-Yan).
Opposite Sigil: Dako

Infinis, the sigil of Eternity. To study Infinis is to learn and understand the universes’ constant circle of life. The orb of life, Infinis’ sphere of influence covers meanings from greatness to fate. To study Infinis is to learn to see the continuity and connectivity of all things.

The Sigil: Infinis consists of a winding path with two protruding bars. This represents the fact that all paths lead to the endlessly cyclical nature of creation.

As a warrior sigil, Infinis usually uses the two sides points (Brackus' Blazing Fires of Dako), but can have another sigil strike through it (The Megalith's Henge). As a booster, it can attach itself to complete a sigil (Erik's Forge Fire), or replace a certain part of a sigil (Dreadcrow's henge).

Used by: Erik (Ogama and Infinis), Adam (Yin, Yan, and Infinis), Brackus (Dako and Infinis), Flinch, and a nameless warlord (Yin and Infinis).
Guardians: Firefox (Infinis), Anaconduit (Nega-Infinis), Dreadcrow (Infinis-Yin), Darkviper (Nega-Infinis-Yin), Lockdown (Ogama-Infinis), and the Megalith (Altas-Infinis).
Opposite Sigil: Altas

Yin, the sigil of Youth. To study Yin is to see the Realm through fresh eyes everyday and to overturn the past in favour of the new. Energy of the Realm, Yin's sphere of influence covers meanings from inexperience to boundless enthusiasm.

The Sigil: Yin is composed of a split bar with another smaller bar driven through it. This represents the sapling growing, reaching its searching tendrils out above the ground. Another amusing interpretation put forward by Disciples of Yan is that Yin represents a man turned on its head, feet in the air peddling madly.

As a warrior, Yin either has the top two points used (Malco's Concentration of Yin), or anything below the horizontal line (Rion's Argent Razor), depending on the sigil. As a booster, Yin has the tendency to use its top two points to replace a line with only one (Kara's Tornado, Rion's Argent Wildfire, Malco's Meteor).

Used by: Kara (Yin and Altas), Rion (Yin and Nega), Adam (Yin, Yan, and Infinis), Flinch, a nameless warlord (Yin and Infinis), Malco (Yin and Dako), Snare (Yin and Sum), and Kid Cole (Yin, Nega, and Dako).
Guardians: V-Moth (Yin), Vehemoth (Yin), Dreadcrow (Yin-Infinis), Darkviper (Nega-Infinis-Yin), Protozoa (Yin-Yan), and Voltanis (Ogama-Yin).
Opposite Sigil: Yan

Yan, the sigil of Wisdom. To study Yan is to seek the wisdom of the ancients and knowledge from the past. Father of all, Yan's sphere of influence covers meanings from enlightenment to caution.

The Sigil: Yan is composed of a twice bent bar struck through by a large bar. This represents the past and the present unchanging and the knowledge and wisdom that comes from age.

As a warrior, Yan either has the vertical line replaced (Arvengus' henge) or the north and south ends are in use (Adam's Power of the Guild). As a booster, Yan will be either on top of the base sigil (The Yan-Dako henge), or even inside it (Melosa's Breath of Zephyr).

Used by: Mel (Yan and Sum) and Adam (Yin, Yan, and Infinis).
Guardians: Draykor (Yan), Arvengus (Nega-Yan), Protozoa (Yin-Yan), and Si'i (Ogama-Yan).
Opposite Sigil: Yin

Nega, the sigil of Force. To study Nega is to learn that destruction and severance are roads to greater things. The hammer of creation, Nega's sphere of influence covers meanings from barbarity to potency.

The Sigil: Nega is composed of a lightning bolt struck through by a bar. This bar is called "The Handle of Force". This represents destructive power that is controlled by an overseeing force. No force is random, no force is meaningless, force always has direction.

As a warrior, Nega's top bar is always used (Anaconduit/Darkviper's henge). As a booster, when there's just one, it either replaces horizontal lines (Rion's Oppressor), or cuts through the sigil (The Nova Henge). When there's more than one, Nega acts more as extensions (Rion's Guise of Pearl) or replacements (Seth's Twisting Chaos).

Used by: Seth (Dako and Nega), Rion (Yin and Nega), and Kid Cole (Dako, Nega, and Yin).
Guardians: Anaconduit (Nega-Infinis), Darkviper (Nega-Infinis-Yin), Arvengus (Nega-Yan), Tormentor (Dako-Nega), Stinger (Nega).
Opposite Sigil: Sum

Dako, the sigil of Chaos. To study Dako is to accept and embrace change. Mother of all creation, Dako's sphere of influence covers meanings from complete anarchy to disarray. To study Dako is to ride the wanton breeze of change, to feel its ebb and flow.

The Sigil: Dako is composed of an orbit struck through by a broad bar. This represents the broken path, the shattered cycle that is Dako.

As a warrior, Dako's vertical line is the key. As a booster, when there's just one, it either sits underneath the warrior sigil (Dark Malco's Black Torpedo) or on top of the sigil (Doku's Blistering Diablo). When there's more than one, it either adds on to the main sigil (Seth's Nega Mass) or replaces a part of it (Malco's Swarm of Locusts).

Used by: Seth (Dako and Nega), Doku, Bo (Dako and Ogama), Kali (Dako and Altas), Kid Cole (Dako, Nega, and Yin), Finn (Dako and Sum), Malco/Dark Malco (Dako and Yin), Brackus (Dako and Infinis), and The Zads (Dako and Ethos).
Guardians: Kragus (Dako), Omnikragg (Dako-Altas), Revoldenn (Dako-Sum), Tormentor (Dako-Nega), Taurius (Dako).
Opposite Sigil: Ogama

Sum, the sigil of Peace. To study Sum is to seek inner peace and to know the undying nature of the Realms energy. The reflecting pool of creation, Sum's sphere of influence covers meanings from harmony to stagnation. To study Sum is to know the undying nature of the Realms energy and the rebirth of all.

The Sigil: Sum is composed of two spheres, one inside the other, attached by two bars. This represents the peace within. Some claim that the symbol is representative of the child in the womb but there is nothing to substantiate this.

As a warrior, Sum tends to have sigils on top, underneath it, and/or inside it (Melosa's Crystal Casket). As a booster, it does the same action except onto another sigil (Melosa's Snow Blast).

Used by: Mel (Sum and Yan), Snare (Sum and Yin), and Finn (Sum and Dako).
Guardians: Sliver (Sum), Revoldenn (Dako-Sum).
Opposite Sigil: Nega

Altas, the sigil of Balance. To study Altas is to know the center, to feel the balance of the sigils. The fulcrum, Altas’ sphere of influence covers meanings from equality to stasis.

The Sigil: Altas is composed of a sphere with four protruding bars. This represents the fact that all paths are connected and unchanging.

As a warrior, Altas uses all four points to its advantage (Kara's Bolt of Altas). It is rarely used as a booster.

Used by: Kara (Yin and Altas), and Kali (Dako and Altas).
Guardians: Megalith (Infinis-Altas), Omniaxor (Altas), Omnikrag (Dako-Altas).
Opposite Sigil: Infinis

Vitus is the sigal of Renewal. It is a new sigil described in the episode Vitus. Seth had a Vitus stone carved by Brim, but it could only be used once. The stone was used on Melosa after she was taken over by the Megalith in 'One Down', its power then was to purge its presence from her. It is unknown whether Vitus will reappear elsewhere in the series. Created by a mysterious stone carver in the Kingdoms of Maligor, Vitus is a bit of a Legend in Rados. Few have seen it and even fewer have used its enigmatic power. Encompassing the powers of renewal (and death which is merely a stage of renewal), it is said the Vitus Sigil can bring the dead back to life and grow crops for thousands to eat. But as there is no recorded use of the sigil that can be confirmed, its power remains a mystery. There is a popular folk tale that claims the Amican Forest was create by a Vitus Stone cast by Kor Yin-an to create a magical retreat for the wizards of Yan, but there is nothing to substantiate this.

The Ninth Sigil also has no known opposite like the other eight sigils which makes it a very unbalanced and combustible power. Theoretically it will only function once and then the stone will be consumed.

The Vitus Sigil represents a spring of water, thrusting up through the two layers of the Realm; the physical and the metasigical.

Used by: Seth (in the form of a champion stone)
Guardians: None

Ethos: This sigil was first introduced by Alnar when he explained to the Defenders about the coming of the Ethos. The Zad and some Ethos emissaries are the only beings in the series so far that use Ethos Stones. It can combine with other sigils to form attacks involving dark sorcery. Also dubbed the "Shadow Stone" by some people. it was confirmed by Greg Collinson to be called Ethos or Mortagor. Strangely, there has been no mention of what the opposite of Ethos is, although it is obvious there is one since it can be cast in stone form. As a warrior, Ethos uses the two bottom horizontal lines (The Zad's attack that resembles a missile). It has not yet been used as a booster.

Used by: The Zads (Ethos and Dako)
Guardians: none
Opposite Sigil: Nostrum Vitae (Unconfirmed)

Nostrum Vitae: When Brackus is a healer, he carries a stone around with another sigil on it. This sigil is confirmed to be called Nostrum Vitae, it was confirmed by Greg Collinson in the Di-Gata Forums. It was introduced in "The Healer". He uses it against Tormentor, causing him to turn to dust upon contact with its power. Like Ethos, there is no mention of the opposite of Nostrum Vitae, although it is assumed to have one, since the stone was used more than once (the first time being offscreen, to heal a baby; this was when the Defenders approached the tent with the Healer in it)

Used by: The Healer (Brackus)
Guardians: Nostrum Vitae Mask
Opposite Sigil: Ethos (Unconfirmed)

Orn-Ra and Mal-Ra:
During the main theme for season 2, there are two instances when new sigils appear. The first is when Eric is seen with his welding equipment, working on a yellow-colored stone. The sigil itself looks like a miniature Dako with an X on top of it. This sigil has been confirmed to be either Mal-Ra or Orn-Ra.

The second instance is when immediately after Eric is wearing a blue-violet colored cloak with the first stone. He then rotates to show a vermillion-colored stone in his hand. This sigil has been dubbed as the XT sigil and has been confirmed to be the opposite of the sigil mentioned above.

Brim apparently knows of their existence and how to carve them, but has had that knowledge transferred to Erik, who is now a master carver.

Key technology 
In the Realm, most technology is carved from stone, or metal and powered by Di-Gata Stones.

The Key
Not necessarily a piece of technology, but still has properties to make it useful. It is a large blue stone engraved with Yan sigils all over it. It is a detector of great energies. If it senses an energy source nearby, it will react by glowing. As it glows brighter, the source is more closer. It is the only tool besides Mel's power that can find the approximate location where the Pure Stone is hiding.

The Defenders kept it after they defeated Malco in "The Key to Victory". However, they lost it when Signey forked it over to Flinch in exchange for the safe return of her mother. The Order of Infinis used The Key to track the Defender's movements after they collected the Dako Pure Stone. At one point, The Key was broken in half by Anaconduit and Kragus in their little tussle in "Doom Chase", the Key was then repaired one episode later. After the key was repaired, Brackus borrowed it to find the Defenders with Malco and Flinch in the sunken Monastery, thinking there would be a Pure Stone and Malco and Flinch may have known where one was. Brackus collects the Ogama Pure Stone in exchance for the return of Melosa. But when Malco and Flinch were going to finish off the Defenders, a sea monster entered the room and attacked them. It grabbed Flinch and tossed him into Brackus as he was leaving. Brackus held on to the Pure Stone, but lost the Key. Seth reclaimed it before they resurfaced from the monastery.

They didn't have the Key for long when they entered the "Den of Thieves". A man bumped into Erik and swiped it from him. Later, Snare manages to get a hold of it. But things get more strange when Adam is seen holding the Key in "The Returning" with the Nova Stone. He used it to find the Yin, Yan and Dako Pure Stones, hoping to find the Defenders. As of that point, the Defenders have held on to the key, even when Adam turned over the pure stones and Kara over to Brackus to "make things right".

Erik's Gauntlet
Erik is the only character besides Flinch and Doku that uses a device to launch or activate stones. He describes it as a "remote energy manipulation gauntlet". His gauntlet can also do other functions like control Robotus, activate other machines, and bio-scans. In Ms. Fortune, it also gave him super strength by using its backup power to operate, however it released a discharge when held on for too long. After this episode ended, this power was inaccessible because the cells that stored this energy were diminished.

Erik added a new function he called the Backlasher. It was designed to absorb energy and redirect it back at its attacker. However, he had problems with the energy flow. Luckily, Von Faustien gave him a sigil flux crystal, which came in handy to contain the energies of an Annihilator stone.

Yan-Altas Container
 For the duration of the first season, the Container was a device designed to hold the Pure stones to shield them from being found by the Key. It is made from a rock called Ultimite, which has the power to absorb magical essences and prevent any energy emissions from occurring. The Defenders first got it from Brim. However, when they found the Dako Pure stone, and had confrontation with the Dakonauts, the Container was destroyed, enabling the Order of Infinis to track the Stones wherever they were. Erik was able to fashion a new container. When the Pure stones were destroyed and the Megalith released, Seth temporarily used the container as a shield for the Nova Stone, preventing it from sensing Nazmul within the stone.

Sigil Stormer
The main transport for the current Defenders to travel around Rados. They are also known as "Bikes". It is fueled on Di-Gata stones. Each of the Defenders have one, and extra people hitch rides with them, but usually have their own helmets. The Stormers are capable of flight and have energy weapons for combat.

Replicator Stone
 In the Bang-yadi mountains, Flinch and Malco put together a machine that could create a limitless supply of squid-like Obelisk robots for the Order. However, Brackus ordered immediate mass production and the Replicator Stone had a power overload. As a result, its programming became self-aware and ordered all it Obelisk creations to destroy all of Rados. It was stopped when Flinch used his Cyclone, amplified by Erik's Generator. In doing so, it shut down the Replicator stone and most of the Obelisks (except one which appeared in "What Lies Beneath", where Seth kills it by ripping out its circuitry via his stone arm).

The Machine of Binding
This machine was used to activate the power of the Pure Stones to seal the Megalith. However, it had no control over the outside damage the seal would cause. In "Dark Descent", the Defenders tried to reverse the polarity of the machine to draw the Pure stones to it, but they nearly destroyed the realm with a Negastorm. However, they managed to keep their Dako Pure Stone and get the Yan Pure Stone in the process. As of now, the Machine of Blinding is now useless, since the Megalith is destroyed and the Pure Stones as well. Even if they could use it again, it was also destroyed by Seth's inhuman strength, because the Spell of Blinding would have destroyed RaDos if it was successful.

The Shift Stone
This device is both a timer and a key. Six of the eight sigils are engraved on each face of the stone, and rotate as time goes on. When all the sigils are aligned, the timer reaches 0 and Rados has an equinox. At this point, the device can be used as a key at the Shift Beacon to open a portal between the Dark Realm (where the Ethos reside) and RaDos itself. Large amounts of energies are required along with the Shift Stone to open larger portals or for people to get out of the Dark Realm and back to RaDos. The Defenders acquired this stone from one of the Zad and used it to open the portal to the Dark Realm to rescue Kara and stop the Ethos simultaneously. The Ethos who were currently in Rados fused the Shift stone to the Beacon but Erik was able to pry it out with his father's tools, barely managing to get it out before more Ethos entered Rados.

Celestial Abyss
Fifty years before the show's current timeline, the Wizards of Yan were fighting the Ethos in the sieges of Yan-Suma. A superweapon created by Flinch, called the Celestial Abyss, was designed to banish the Ethos to the Dark Realm. However, due to Melosa's interference in the past, the device was frozen and in Ethos hands. It was recovered and a younger Brackus used the device to finish the Ethos. The Celestial Abyss was then broken up into five pieces that would later be known as the Five Icons. Each icon was hidden by a Wizard of Yan so no evil can ever re-assemble it and use it. They can be found in two ways: Either by using the orb of Ogama-Yan, or the five Tracker Stones that the Defenders currently have in their possession. The Ethos are using this weapon to re-open a portal to the Dark Realm, while the Defenders are trying to re-seal them. The Orb of Ogama-Yan is currently in possession of Kara who stole it from Malco's vault. The Defenders now have all but one Icon, which is yet to be found.Later Filch and Malco create the weapon which releases the Ethos after which Rion uses them to form his armour and succeeds in destroying the Ethos.

The Guardianizer
It was a rifle-sized weapon, created and developed by Si'i. It had the power to absorb guardians into its mechanism, then release a mutant guardian, made up of both body and sigil parts of the original guardians used. However, the cost was these guardians were psychotic and couldn't distinguish allies from foes. It was used on the Defender's guardians when they was found out about Si'i's illegal operation (It was illegal in RaDos to distribute or sell Guardians unless you had some affiliation with the Gata-shin Monks or Wizards of Yan). The Guardianizer was later modified to have its effects reversed, saving the Defender's guardians from a permanent mutation.

It was later rebuilt by Flinch, into a form of a giant cannon mounted to a chain in the ground (it had the power of levitation). Dark Malco wanted to use it so he could turn Rion into a Guardian, which Si'i split the beans about how this process was done. It was able to turn Rion into a mutated and uncontrollable guardian, and it required Seth to do the same thing to control him (Seth had a spell cast on him by Melosa so he wouldn't become berserk himself). The cannon was eventually trashed by falling debris and Si'i fell into the lava pit with it, after Seth and Rion were turned back into their original forms. However, Si'i became its last victim and flew off.

Dakonaut
 Tall, levitating, one-eyed robots built for one purpose: to serve Nazmul. About twelve years ago, the Dakonauts were defeated by the Wizards of Yan, but it took a large portion of their order to be able to pull it off. Four of them were rebuilt years later and were sent out to seek the megalith energy inside of Melosa. At first, the Defenders believed they were after the Dako Pure Stone, but they were really after Melosa. Seth then used the Vitus stone against Melosa, which released the Megalith energy within her. The energy that rippled out of her caused the Dakonauts to be destroyed again.

Seth's Mech arm
 A robotic rock arm made by Erik so Seth could remain a Defender when he sacrificed his hand to Brackus. Erik wasn't finished stabilizing the Infimatter and had the power to influence Seth to work for Doku. Seth removes it after his hand was restored. He loses it again after he nearly destroyed Arboth with its awesome power. Seth later quits the Defenders for the inexplicable acts he committed.

 After he returns to the Defenders, he gets another arm. At first it seems like your average metallic hand. But when it touches Seth's Di-Gata stones, it transforms into an arm-cannon, containing the stones within its mechanism. When it fires the stones, the spell is summoned and the hand reverts to a claw mechanism. The stones used are contained within it and Seth has control over the direction the spell is fired, allowing for improved accuracy and control in battles.

Wizard Tower
 Made after the Ethos war, these mighty castles were meant for the Wizards of Yan to reconnect with the sky. Nazmul's keep is an example. Though meant as a place of healing and knowledge, the Wizards installed a number of gun turrets just in case of attack.

An abandoned one by taken by Doku and his cohorts but they didn't have the necessary codes to operate it. Fortunately for them, Adam had the codes and inputted them one by one. Doku managed to copy the codes to take full control of the tower and sent it to Arboth to harvest its di-gata energy. Using a device called Regenesis, he regenerated his right hand and eye. His further plans were to travel beyond Rados but that required Di-Gata Defender energy. It just so happened that Seth, corrupted by his mech arm, was the perfect subject. But when Seth realizes what he had done, he reversed the energy flow, restoring Arboth and then smashed the Regenesis device, bringing the tower down to the ground.

Henge/Champion Stones 
Phase Stone
 The Phase stone was owned by Adam and given to Melosa in "The Town that Time Forgot", as a parting gift. The spell on this stone is cast when tossed into an inanimate object or wall. As long as the spell is active, the user can walk through it as if it never existed. The stone can be recovered while shifting.

 Mel only used its power once to get into the shaman's house without breaking the door down. Later on, in "Den of Thieves", it was used to release the Yinicor upon the Rougon thieves. The monster smashed open the cage that Melosa and Adam were held prisoner in. However, it was then taken back in "Adam and Eve of Destruction" as Adam used it to bust himself and Brackus out of Nazmul's dungeon. It has the henge of Yin and Infinis (The points on Yin are replaced by Infinis, much like Dreadcrow's henge).

The Nova Stone
The Nova stone was carved by Nazmul and Sari and was owned by Seth's father and then given to Seth after his death. It is extremely rare and has great power, making it the ultimate last resort weapon against evil. It has its own power source, so that it can be cast even when the caster's stone energy is depleted. When Seth cast it in The Key to Victory in order to defeat Malco, it fired a large beam of light (much like the beam attacks from Dragon Ball Z). But at the time, Seth's control over it was limited, as the recoil from the stone, knocked him back with the other Defenders.

A portion of its power was later consumed by Brim to construct the Vitus Stone for Seth. Though at the end of the episode, it is shown that Seth was tricked into giving the Nova Stone to Brim.

The stone was then recovered by Adam (mysteriously) and then was given to Seth to destroy the guardian of the Yin Pure Stone, and also gained complete mastery of its awesome power. However, Brackus then stole it because of its modified prison function was necessary to defeat Nazmul. The function was added on by Brim and Brackus found out about its power through Lizel.

Adam then gets it back for the Defenders and it is then used by Seth to separate Nazmul from Malco and sealed his spirit. Its power assisted later with the Warrior Henge and Kara to destroy the Megalith. However, Malco and Flinch stole it to try to free Nazmul, but were unsuccessful in doing so until the Ethos offered their help.

Malco and Flinch eventually take Brim hostage and use him to break open the Nova Stone, freeing Nazmul's spirit. However, Brim designed it so that it needs another host to contain Nazmul's spirit. After draining the life force from Malco, Nazmul began to walk RaDos. Only to have his power cut off by Brackus (to walk on Rados, Nazmul needed the Nova Stone's power) and destroyed by Seth's Nega Mass spell.

The Defenders currently hold onto the Nova Stone, and Nazmul's spirit has been vanquished from its confines. The Nova Stone has the Di-Gata (Ogama and Nega) henge on it (also called Nova).

The Flawed Stone
This stone was only seen in Flaw in The Ointment. It corrupted the villager's minds by creating an illusion of a Paradise, when really the village was corrupted and rotten. The elder didn't see that it was flawed. Mel was the only one who was immune to its effects after she saw through the illusion, and wasn't affected by its mind-altering powers. After she found where the stone was, she pulled the plug on the generator that was amplifying the stone's power. And by accident, Sebastian (the elder's robot servant) ran it over, destroying the stone and breaking the curse on the village.

Its henge consisted of Altas and two Negas (The Nega's top points are connected to the left and right sides of Altas).

Tracking Stone
 The stone that Adam used so that Brackus could be easily found by the rest of the Order of Infinis. It has only appeared in Adam and Eve of Destruction and it is unknown whether that stone will ever show up again or how it works. One theory is that there is a power inside that needs a special device to pick up, another it could be like the GPS system. Its henge was made up of Sum and the Altas-Infinis henges (The line in the centre of Sum was replaced by the Altas-Infinis henge).

Transporter Stone
A transport system used in the Bakorian cycle. Brackus discovered it and use the system to transport his entire Yin-Tos army to the Spell Zone. This stone is required to summon and activate its power.

Its henge consists of Yin, Ogama and Altas (joined in order from top to bottom going middle) engraved on the stone.

Shaman's Stone
Only seen near the end of The One, the shaman used the stone to absorb the attack that was directed at him. He then cast it and a creature somewhat similar to the absorbed attack came out of it which attacked Malco. It was given to him by a Gatashun monk who was carrying the Dako Pure Stone.

Its henge consists of Yin and Sum (connected in order from top to bottom)

The Eternity Stone
 This champion stone has appeared in Back Track. Acquired from Dark Malco, Mel uses this stone and the staff given by a mysterious spirit in order to transport herself into the past. It is unknown whether it will reappear, as Melosa's grandmother kept it when she sent her forward in time.

 Erik theorizes that the Eternity stone might tamper with the laws of temporal mechanics in which time is actually a loop instead of a straight line.

 Its henge consists of Yin, Altas, Infinis, and Yan (joined in order from top to bottom).Annihilator Stone'''
 First appeared in "Von Faustien". Von Faustien tracked an Ethos-infested witch, Lady K'Tahsh to Port Reevus, threatening to activate an Annihilator Stone to finish her. It is a superweapon compacted into a stone, with enough raw power to eradicate any life form or structure within a ten-mile radius. The stone was activated by accident, but Erik managed to use his modified Energy Bider to fire the energy into the sky, preventing disaster.

See alsoD.N. Ace'' – a later Nelvana show whose intended follow-up season was never made, ending on a cliffhanger with a mysterious unidentified antagonist

References

External links
 Di-Gata Defenders Official Site (Archive.org copy)
 

Fox Broadcasting Company original programming
Canadian children's animated superhero television series
Jetix original programming
Disney XD original programming
Teletoon original programming
Television series by Nelvana
2000s Canadian animated television series
2000s Canadian science fiction television series
2006 Canadian television series debuts
2008 Canadian television series endings
Teen animated television series
Teen superhero television series
Canadian children's animated action television series
Canadian children's animated space adventure television series
Canadian children's animated drama television series
Canadian children's animated science fantasy television series
Anime-influenced Western animated television series
Television series based on classical mythology
Television series based on Egyptian mythology